Allaby is a surname. Notable people with the surname include:

 Eric Allaby (born 1943), Canadian politician
 Michael Allaby (born 1933), English writer